Natcom  may refer to:

National Communications Corporation Limited (NATCOM), a New Zealand provider of Internet access and related services
Natcom Bancshares, the parent of National Bank of Commerce in Superior, Wisconsin
National Communication Association, a scholarly society
National Aviation Consultants, a Canadian airline which uses the code NATCOM
National Communications Magazine
National Commuter Airlines, a former operator of Aérospatiale N 262
National Telecom S.A, a Haitian mobile telecommunications company